Constantine IX Monomachos (1004 – 11 January 1055), reigned as Byzantine emperor from June 1042 to January 1055. Empress Zoë Porphyrogenita chose him as a husband and co-emperor in 1042, although he had been exiled for conspiring against her previous husband, Emperor Michael IV the Paphlagonian. The couple shared the throne with Zoë's sister Theodora Porphyrogenita. Zoë died in 1050, and Constantine continued his collaboration with Theodora until his own death five years later. 

Constantine waged wars against groups which included the Kievan Rus', the Pechenegs and, in the East, the rising Seljuq Turks. Despite the varying success of these campaigns, the Byzantine Empire largely retained the borders established after the conquests of Basil II, even expanding eastwards when Constantine annexed the wealthy Armenian kingdom of Ani. Constantine accordingly may be considered the last effective emperor of Byzantium’s apogee.  

In the year before his death, in  1054, the Great Schism between the Eastern Orthodox and Roman Catholic Churches took place, culminating in Pope Leo IX excommunicating the Patriarch Michael Keroularios. Constantine was aware of the political and religious consequences of such a  disunion, but his attempts to prevent it had been futile.

Early life
Constantine Monomachos was the son of Theodosios Monomachos, an important bureaucrat under Basil II and Constantine VIII, of the famous and noble Monomachos family. His mother is unknown but may have been a certain Irene of the Armenian Taronites/ Tornikios family. Constantine was born around 1000-1004 in Antioch, and he likely spoke Syriac or Arabic as well as Greek and was described by contemporaries as  "a marvel of a beauty". At some point Constantine's father Theodosios had been suspected of conspiracy, and his son's career suffered accordingly. Constantine's position improved after he married his second wife, a niece of Emperor Romanos III Argyros. Catching the eye of Empress Zoë Porphyrogenita, he was exiled to Mytilene on the island of Lesbos by her second husband, Emperor Michael IV.

The death of Michael IV and the overthrow of Michael V in 1042 led to Constantine being recalled from his place of exile and appointed as a judge in Greece. However, before he could commence his appointment, Constantine was summoned to Constantinople, where the fragile working relationship between Michael V's successors, Empresses Zoë and Theodora Porphyrogenita, was breaking down. After two months of increasing acrimony between the two, Zoë decided to search for a new husband, thereby hoping to prevent her sister from increasing her popularity and authority.

After her first preference displayed contempt for the empress and her second died under mysterious circumstances, Zoë remembered the handsome and urbane Constantine. The pair were married on 11 June, without the participation of Patriarch Alexius of Constantinople, who refused to officiate over a third marriage (for both spouses). Constantine was crowned on the following day.

Reign

Constantine continued the purge instituted by Zoë and Theodora, removing the relatives of Michael V from the court. The new emperor was pleasure-loving and prone to violent outbursts on suspicion of conspiracy. He was heavily influenced by his controversial wife or mistress, Maria Skleraina, a relative of his second wife, and Maria's family. Constantine had another mistress, an "Alan princess", Gurandukht, likely the daughter of George I. 

In August 1042 Constantine relieved the general George Maniakes from his command in Italy, and Maniakes rebelled, declaring himself emperor in September.  He transferred his troops into the Balkans and was about to defeat Constantine's army in battle, when he was wounded and died on the field, ending the crisis in 1043.

Immediately after the victory, Constantine was attacked by a fleet from Kievan Rus'; it is "incontrovertible that a Rus' detachment took part in the Maniakes rebellion". They too were defeated, with the help of Greek fire.  As part of the peace negotiations Constantine married his daughter Anastasia to the future Prince Vsevolod I of Kiev, the son of his opponent Yaroslav I the Wise. Constantine's family name Monomachos ("one who fights alone") was inherited by Vsevolod and Anastasia's son, Vladimir II Monomakh.

Constantine IX's preferential treatment of Maria Skleraina in the early part of his reign led to rumors that she was planning to murder Zoë and Theodora.  This led to a popular uprising by the citizens of Constantinople in 1044, which came dangerously close to harming Constantine as he participated in a religious procession. The mob was only quieted by the appearance at a balcony of Zoë and Theodora, who reassured the people that they were not in any danger of assassination.

In 1045 Constantine annexed the Armenian kingdom of Ani, but this expansion merely exposed the empire to new enemies. In 1046 the Byzantines came into contact for the first time with the Seljuk Turks.  They met in battle in Armenia in 1048 and settled a truce the following year.  Even if the Seljuk rulers were willing to abide by the treaty, their unruly Turcoman allies showed much less restraint. The Byzantine forces would suffer a cataclysmic defeat at the battle of Manzikert in 1071. Constantine began persecuting the Armenian Church, trying to force it into union with the Orthodox Church. In 1046, he refounded the University of Constantinople by creating the Departments of Law and Philosophy.

In 1047 Constantine was faced by the rebellion of his nephew Leo Tornikios, who gathered supporters in Adrianople and was proclaimed emperor by the army. Tornikios was forced to retreat, failed in another siege, and was captured during his flight.  The revolt had weakened Byzantine defenses in the Balkans, and in 1048 the area was raided by the Pechenegs, who continued to plunder it for the next five years. The emperor's efforts to contain the enemy through diplomacy merely exacerbated the situation, as rival Pecheneg leaders clashed on Byzantine ground, and Pecheneg settlers were allowed to live in compact settlement in the Balkans, making it difficult to suppress their rebellion.

Constantine seems to have taken recourse to the pronoia system, a sort of Byzantine feudal contract in which tracts of land (or the tax revenue from it) were granted to particular individuals in exchange for contributing to and maintaining military forces. Constantine could be wasteful with the imperial treasury. On one occasion he is said to have sent an Arab leader 500,000 gold coins, over two tons of gold.

In 1054 the centuries-old differences between the Eastern and Western churches led to their final separation. Legates from Pope Leo IX excommunicated the Patriarch of Constantinople Michael Keroularios when Keroularios would not agree to adopt western church practices, and in return Keroularios excommunicated the legates.  This sabotaged Constantine's attempts to ally with the Pope against the Normans, who had taken advantage of the disappearance of Maniakes to take over Southern Italy.

Constantine tried to intervene, but he fell ill and died on 11 January of the following year. He was persuaded by his councillors, chiefly the logothetes tou dromou John, to ignore the rights of the elderly Theodora, daughter of Constantine VIII, and to pass the throne to the doux of Bulgaria, Nikephoros Proteuon. However, Theodora was recalled from her retirement and named empress.

Architecture and art
The literary circle at the court of Constantine IX included the philosopher and historian Michael Psellos, whose Chronographia records the history of Constantine's reign. Psellos left a physical description of Constantine in his Chronographia: he was "ruddy as the sun, but all his breast, and down to his feet... [were] colored the purest white all over, with exquisite accuracy. When he was in his prime, before his limbs lost their virility, anyone who cared to look at him closely would surely have likened his head to the sun in its glory, so radiant was it, and his hair to the rays of the sun, while in the rest of his body he would have seen the purest and most translucent crystal."  

Immediately upon ascending to the throne in 1042, Constantine IX set about restoring the Church of the Holy Sepulchre in Jerusalem, which had been substantially destroyed in 1009 by Caliph al-Hakim bi-Amr Allah. Byzantine Emperor Romanos III had secured the right to undertake such a restoration in a treaty with al-Hakim's son al-Zahir, but it was Constantine who finally set the project in motion, funding the reconstruction of the Church and other Christian establishments in the Holy Land.

See also

 List of Byzantine emperors

References

Sources

Primary sources
 Michael Psellus, Fourteen Byzantine Rulers, trans. E.R.A. Sewter (Penguin, 1966).

Secondary sources
 
 
 
 
 
 
 
 
 Angold, Michael. The Byzantine empire 1025–1204 (Longman, 2nd edition, 1997). 
 Harris, Jonathan. Constantinople: Capital of Byzantium (Hambledon/Continuum, 2007). 
 Finlay, George. History of the Byzantine Empire from 716 – 1057, William Blackwood & Sons, 1853.
 Garland, Lynda. Conformity and Non-conformity in Byzantium, Verlag Adolf M. Hakkert, 1997. 

Macedonian dynasty
11th-century Byzantine emperors
1000s births
1055 deaths
Eastern Orthodox monarchs
Monomachos family
1040s in the Byzantine Empire
1050s in the Byzantine Empire